Lakewood High School is a public high school in St. Petersburg, Florida operated by Pinellas County Schools. It opened in 1966 with students previously attending St. Petersburg High School and Boca Ciega High School. Lakewood High is one of the most highly funded schools in the county, due to the Center for Advanced Technologies, a magnet program attached to Lakewood.

Special programs
CATCOM (Center for Advanced Technologies Communications and Original Media), a video production class and club within the CAT program, was created by Mark Granning and Dr. Martin Shapiro in 1990. CATCOM Studios, now known as Mark W. Granning Studios following his retirement, produces a daily in-house 15-minute news program called Fast Forward and once produced award-winning segments, known as "FOX ThirTEEN Magazine," for the local Fox affiliate. CATCOM has won numerous Student Emmys for its work.  Acceptance into the program is competitive, as only about 75 students may participate each year.

Also well known for the AMSET, Academy for Marine Science, program directed by James Kostka. Lakewood also recently added the CJAM, Center for Journalism and Multimedia, program to its curriculum.

Demographics
Lakewood HS is 65% Black, 25% White, 6% Hispanic, and 4% other.

Notable alumni 
 Rodney Adams, NFL wide receiver for the Chicago Bears
 Ricky Anderson, former NFL player
Bo Bichette, MLB player for the Toronto Blue Jays
 Lynn Barry, former basketball player, former Assistant Executive Director of USA women's basketball, former WNBA special advisor, former NCAA official 
 Aveion Cason, former NFL running back
 William Floyd, former NFL fullback
 Dante Fowler, NFL defensive end for the Dallas Cowboys
 Jonte Green, former NFL defensive back for Detroit Lions
 Marquez Valdes-Scantling, NFL wide receiver for Green Bay Packers
 Shaquem Griffin, NFL linebacker for Seattle Seahawks
 Shaquill Griffin, NFL cornerback for Seattle Seahawks
 Louis Murphy, former NFL wide receiver for Tampa Bay Buccaneers
 Bernard Reedy, former NFL wide receiver for Tampa Bay Buccaneers
 Rashod Moulton, former NFL cornerback
 Cornell Green, former NFL offensive tackle
 Billy DeCola, reality TV (NY Ink)
 Ernest Givins, former NFL wide receiver
 Tom Carter, former NFL defensive back
 Tim Carter, former NFL wide receiver
 Timothy L. Tyler, former prisoner sentenced to life without parole for breaking the Three-strikes law until being granted clemency by president Barack Obama.
 Pat Terrell, former NFL defensive back
 Patrick Carter, former NFL wide receiver
 Nicole Haislett ('90), 1992 2-time Olympic gold medal swimmer (Barcelona)
 William Packer, movie producer, Stomp the Yard, This Christmas
 Rose Richmond, 2004 USA Olympic team
 Jeff Frederick, former member of Virginia House of Delegates and former Chairman of Republican Party of Virginia
 Isaiah Wynn, NFL offensive tackle for the New England Patriots
Carl Willis, WJLA-TV news anchor, Washington, DC
Rod Wave, rapper

References

External links 
 Lakewood High website
 Pinellas County Schools
 Center for Advanced Technologies website
 Lakewood High School Alumni Group

High schools in Pinellas County, Florida
Public high schools in Florida
1966 establishments in Florida
Educational institutions established in 1966